Te Pahu is a rural community in the Waipa District and Waikato region of New Zealand's North Island, located just north of Cambridge across State Highway 1.

It is located north of Pirongia and south of Ngāhinapōuri just off State Highway 39.

Karamu Walkway runs along the Kapamahunga Range to the north of the village. It is part of Te Araroa long-distance walkway.

History

Early history

The first recorded settlers of the area are descendants of the Tainui waka, led by Māhanga, who established Purakau Pā at the junction of the Kaniwhaniwha stream and the Waipā River and settled the lower valley in the late sixteenth century. Māhanga's son Tonganui suffered a major defeat to Kawhia Māori. The tribe suffered a major defeat to Europeans during the Invasion of the Waikato; their land was confiscated and they were forced to relocate to the north.

In 1879 peace negotiations Prime Minister Grey said Harapepe was excluded from the proposal to return Waikato lands to King Tāwhiao, even though former Minister of Native Affairs, Donald McLean, had included it in his offer of terms. A Waitangi Tribunal report says, "This was, it seems, the first official public admission that not all Crown lands were to be made available to return to the Kīngitanga. In particular, the Grey Government planned to exclude the blocks that McLean had repurchased specifically to include them in the package of lands ringfenced for return, which were mostly in the Harapepe district around Pirongia. But Grey did say that some Harapepe lands would be set aside as an endowment for a school at which Kīngitanga children could be educated."

European settlement

He was the son of John Cowell, a lay missionary, who came to work with Samuel Marsden. After the 1864 invasion, John Cowell lost all his lands under the Confiscation Act and died in poverty. His Homewood house, on Rosborough Road, to the south of Te Pahu, may date from 1841 and be the oldest surviving building in Waikato.

During the war the area was settled by British militia, who were banned from leaving the area but often too poor to buy crops to continue living there. Many lots were abandoned; settlers who continued living there constantly feared attack from local Māori and often sought shelter in a blockhouse. A local industry of flax milling, and mixed cow and pig farming.

Te Pahu remained extremely isolated for many years, with settlers relying on supplies delivered by the Waipā River. A pub and general store were established in the 1860s, followed by a post office in 1866 and a school house in 1877. The school house was used for monthly Presbyterian church services; it closed briefly and reopened before burning down in 1891; another school opened nearby in 1889 and took in the remaining students.

A bridge was built over the river in 1881, reducing the community's isolation.

The area was struck by major flooding in 1907 and February 1958, leaving the community again cut off from Te Awamutu and Hamilton.

A limeworks was built on Limeworks Loop Rd in 1917.

Harapepe 
It was originally the main military settlement in the area, with –

 a blockhouse (in a 1943 aerial photo it was c.  square on a long ridge, but is now only a slight mound),
 a redoubt (built in February 1865 by the Forest Rangers, but no longer visible),
 a store,
 Settlers Arms Hotel,
 Harapepe School (1877–91),
 a Post Office (1867–1930)

The importance of Harapepe seems to have declined after Harapepe dairy was built at Te Pahu in 1897 and was joined in 1909 by neighbouring Te Pahu Post Office. A daily mail service to both post offices started in 1913 and was taking passengers in 1914. Te Pahu Hall also opened nearby in 1911. The hall was renovated and extended between 1979 and 1981.

As late as 1935 the name Harapepe was still being used to describe a proposed extension of electric power supplies.

Modern history

In the 1920s and 1930s Robertson, then Hodgson's, Motors ran a daily bus from Pirongia to Hamilton via Te Pahu.

A new garage and general store was established in 1952. A limeworks opened in 1972.

In 2019, Waikato Regional Council reported a surge of complaints about farm effluent discharges from farms at several Waikato locations including Te Pahu.

Demographics 
Te Pahu settlement is in three SA1 statistical areas which also include Harapepe and cover . The SA1 areas are part of the larger Te Pahu statistical area.

The SA1 areas had a population of 468 at the 2018 New Zealand census, an increase of 69 people (17.3%) since the 2013 census, and an increase of 81 people (20.9%) since the 2006 census. There were 159 households, comprising 243 males and 231 females, giving a sex ratio of 1.05 males per female, with 117 people (25.0%) aged under 15 years, 72 (15.4%) aged 15 to 29, 237 (50.6%) aged 30 to 64, and 42 (9.0%) aged 65 or older.

Ethnicities were 89.1% European/Pākehā, 10.3% Māori, 1.9% Pacific peoples, 1.9% Asian, and 5.1% other ethnicities. People may identify with more than one ethnicity.

Although some people chose not to answer the census's question about religious affiliation, 58.3% had no religion, 30.1% were Christian, 0.6% were Buddhist and 2.6% had other religions.

Of those at least 15 years old, 87 (24.8%) people had a bachelor's or higher degree, and 48 (13.7%) people had no formal qualifications. 69 people (19.7%) earned over $70,000 compared to 17.2% nationally. The employment status of those at least 15 was that 198 (56.4%) people were employed full-time, 57 (16.2%) were part-time, and 18 (5.1%) were unemployed.

Te Pahu statistical area

The statistical area had a population of 1,428 at the 2018 New Zealand census, an increase of 159 people (12.5%) since the 2013 census, and an increase of 234 people (19.6%) since the 2006 census. There were 507 households, comprising 744 males and 684 females, giving a sex ratio of 1.09 males per female. The median age was 39.1 years (compared with 37.4 years nationally), with 318 people (22.3%) aged under 15 years, 228 (16.0%) aged 15 to 29, 735 (51.5%) aged 30 to 64, and 150 (10.5%) aged 65 or older.

Ethnicities were 91.2% European/Pākehā, 10.1% Māori, 1.3% Pacific peoples, 2.3% Asian, and 4.4% other ethnicities. People may identify with more than one ethnicity.

The percentage of people born overseas was 15.1, compared with 27.1% nationally.

Although some people chose not to answer the census's question about religious affiliation, 56.1% had no religion, 32.8% were Christian, 0.2% were Buddhist and 2.3% had other religions.

Of those at least 15 years old, 270 (24.3%) people had a bachelor's or higher degree, and 165 (14.9%) people had no formal qualifications. The median income was $40,300, compared with $31,800 nationally. 246 people (22.2%) earned over $70,000 compared to 17.2% nationally. The employment status of those at least 15 was that 633 (57.0%) people were employed full-time, 195 (17.6%) were part-time, and 33 (3.0%) were unemployed.

Education

The school opened in 1911.

Notable people 

 Helen Clark, former Prime Minister of New Zealand, administrator of the UN Development Programme

See also 
 Toothbrush fence on Limeworks Loop Road

References

Sources

External links 

 1865 map

Waipa District
Populated places in Waikato